Sport climbing at the 2007 Asian Indoor Games was held in MUST Pavilion, Macau, China from 30 October to 2 November 2007.

Medalists

Men

Women

Medal table

Results

Men

Lead
31 October – 2 November

Speed
30 October

Qualification

Knockout round

Women

Lead
31 October – 2 November

Speed
30 October

Qualification

Knockout round

 Dinara Irsaliyeva was awarded bronze because of no three-medal sweep per country rule.

References
 International Federation of Sport Climbing

2007 Asian Indoor Games events
Sport climbing at the Asian Indoor Games
2007 in sport climbing